The following are the football (soccer) events of the year 1910 throughout the world.

Events
 20 November, Portuguese team Vitória F.C. is founded.
 1 September – The foundation of Sport Club Corinthians Paulista.
 24 February, Swedish team Malmö FF is founded.
 Suffering from financial problems and close to bankruptcy, Woolwich Arsenal are liquidated and reformed, being bought out by Fulham chairman Henry Norris.
 Millwall Athletic move from their ground in North Greenwich to The Old Den in New Cross.
 Ayr United F.C. is founded.

Winners club national championship
Argentina: Alumni Athletic Club
Belgium: Union Saint-Gilloise
England: Aston Villa
Germany: Karlsruher FV
Hungary: Ferencváros
Italy: Internazionale Milano F.C.
Luxembourg: Racing Club Luxembourg
Netherlands: H.V.V.
Paraguay: Club Libertad
Romania: Olympia București
Scotland: For fuller coverage, see 1909-10 in Scottish football.
Scottish Division One – Celtic
Scottish Division Two – Leith Athletic
Scottish Cup – Dundee
Sweden: IFK Göteborg
Uruguay: CA River Plate
Greece: F.C. Goudi Athens

International tournaments
 1910 British Home Championship (March 12 – April 11, 1912)

Births
 31 December – Albert Curwood, professional footballer (d. 1971)

Deaths
 13 June – Alfred Staines, professional cricketer (born 1838)

References

 
Association football by year